Tighra is a mid-sized village located in the district of Gurgaon in the state of Haryana in India. It has a population of about 5000 persons living in around 1000 households.

Tighra gaon is dominated by Tanwar Gujjars and BHARDWAJ Brahmins. Near by sectors are 50, 57 A and Dlf Phase III.Mohan Ram Mandir also situated in Tighra gaon. This village is popular for baba mohan Ram Mandir.every month on the day of ekadhasi lot of people visit baba mohan ram mandir.

See also
 Brahmin
 Gujjars
 Tanwars
 Gurgaon
 Haryana

References 

Villages in Gurgaon district